Youssef Chippo (born 10 May 1973) is a Moroccan retired footballer. He was a renowned midfielder for the Morocco national team during the 1990s, and was a member of the team that participated in the 1992 Summer Olympics in Barcelona and the 1998 FIFA World Cup.

Club career
Born in Boujad, Chippo began his career at KAC Kénitra. He spent two seasons at Porto where he began to display his talent in Europe.

In 1999, he signed for Coventry City in the Premier League where he played alongside fellow Moroccan international Mustapha Hadji in midfield. Coventry City were relegated in his second season, but he remained at the club for two more years. With Coventry City in financial trouble and looking to offload players, Chippo joined the Qatari side Al Sadd on a six-month loan on 11 April 2003. The loan was cancelled early at the end of June. However, he played at Al Sadd until 2005.

On 24 February 2007, it was reported that Hibernian would be taking Chippo on trial. In October 2007, Swedish club Hammarby IF also gave him a trial, but he was not offered a contract.

International career
Chippo was selected for the Morocco squads for the 1992 Summer Olympics, the 1998 FIFA World Cup, where he started three matches but scored an own goal against Norway, and four African Cup of Nations squads between 1998 and 2006. He missed the 2004 African Nations Cup in Tunisia after falling out with the team's coach, Ezzaki Badou, but was recalled by Mohamed Fakhir for the 2006 tournament. He retired from international competition after the tournament, having won 62 caps.

Personal life 
Chippo is now a television football analyst. He is also a businessman. He works as a TV presenter and sports analyst for beIN Sports MENA in Doha, Qatar.

Chippo also runs a football academy to help players reach their potential.

Career statistics

International

International goals
Scores and results list Morocco's goal tally first, score column indicates score after each Chippo goal.

Honours
 Primeira Divisão (2): 1997–98, 1998–99
 Portuguese Cup (1): 1997–98
 Portuguese SuperCup (1): 1998
 Qatar National First Division (1): 2004

References

External links

1973 births
Moroccan footballers
Moroccan expatriate footballers
Morocco international footballers
Living people
1998 FIFA World Cup players
Footballers at the 1992 Summer Olympics
Olympic footballers of Morocco
1998 African Cup of Nations players
2000 African Cup of Nations players
2002 African Cup of Nations players
2006 Africa Cup of Nations players
Al-Wakrah SC players
Premier League players
Primeira Liga players
FC Porto players
Coventry City F.C. players
Al Sadd SC players
Al Hilal SFC players
Expatriate footballers in England
Expatriate footballers in Portugal
Expatriate footballers in Qatar
People from Boujad
Moroccan expatriate sportspeople in England
Moroccan expatriate sportspeople in Portugal
Moroccan expatriate sportspeople in Qatar
Association football midfielders
Botola players
Saudi Professional League players
Qatar Stars League players